Chidananda Parasappa Siddhashrama, known as CPS or Prof. Siddhashrama is an Indian academic, writer, critic and poet, known for his works in Kannada. He is a retired professor of Mysore University where he served as the acting Vice Chancellor. In 2020, for his contributions to the field of literature, Siddhashrama has been awarded the Karnataka Rajyotsava Award by Government of Karnataka.

Career

As academic
Siddhashrama served as a Kannada professor in Mysore university's Kuvempu Institution for Kannada Studies, where he was also the director of the institution. He served as the acting Vice Chancellor of the university.

As writer
He is known for his works in literary criticism and research. His works on Old and Medieval Kannada literature are noted.
His critical work on modern Kannada literature 'Hosa Ale: Sahitya Vimarshe' was published in 1978. His other works including 'Shodha Sampada' and 'Mastiyavara Kavya: Ondu Adhyayana'.

Literary works
Criticism
 Hosa Ale (1978)
 Holahu
 Nikasha
 Ditada Dittiya Payana
 Devanura Mahadeva Sahityada Olanota
 Asmithe
 Vilanghana
 Kannada Sahitya Mattu Vishwapragne 
 Ambigara Chowdaiah
 Kannada Kavya Vichara
 Sahitya Viveka
 Sahitya Shikharagalu
 Seemaatheetha

Research
 Mastiyavara Kavya: Ondu Adhyayana (1992)
 Paarangatha
 Shodha Sampada 
 L. Basavaraju Avara Jeevana Mattu Sahitya Vimarshe (2005)

Collection of poems
 Mugila Mareya Nesara
 Jaagarada Jangama
 Kavyamandara (ed)

 Autobiography
 Naanallada Nanu (2016)

Accolades
 2020 - Karnataka Rajyotsava Award
 ‛Harigolu’ - a felicitation volume, dedicated by writers.

See also
Aravinda Malagatti
L. Basavaraju
Keertinath Kurtakoti
Siddalingaiah
Jayalakshmi Seethapura
C. P. Krishnakumar

References

Kannada poets
Kannada-language writers
Living people
People from Dharwad district
1954 births